Two Creeks is an unincorporated community in southwestern Manitoba, Canada. It is located approximately 21 kilometers (13 miles) northwest of Virden, Manitoba in the Rural Municipality of Wallace.

References 

Unincorporated communities in Westman Region